Hamid Reza Dastmalchi is an Iranian-American professional poker player.

Dastmalchi won the 1992 World Series of Poker (WSOP) Main Event, which is his largest tournament win at $1 million. He again made the final table of the Main Event in 1995, finishing in fourth place.

Dastmalchi was involved in a legal dispute in 1999 with Binion's Horseshoe after the new management would not let him cash in $865,000 in chips he had won under the prior management. A gaming commission ultimately ruled the chips should be cashed.

In his career, Dastmalchi has won three WSOP bracelets, his last victory coming in 1993.

Dastmalchi's last major tournament cash came in 2002 in the World Poker Tour Five Diamond World Poker Classic.

Although he rarely plays in tournaments anymore, his total live tournament winnings exceed $1,800,000 as of 2009, with his ten cashes at the WSOP accounting for $1,600,760 of those winnings.

World Series of Poker Bracelets

References

External links
 Pokerpages.com profile: Hamid Dastmalchi

Year of birth missing (living people)
Living people
American people of Iranian descent
American poker players
Iranian poker players
World Series of Poker bracelet winners
World Series of Poker Main Event winners